England and Englishness are represented in multiple forms within J. R. R. Tolkien's Middle-earth writings; it appears, more or less thinly disguised, in the form of the Shire and the lands close to it; in kindly characters such as Treebeard, Faramir, and Théoden; in its industrialised state as Isengard and Mordor; and as Anglo-Saxon England in Rohan. Lastly, and most pervasively, Englishness appears in the words and behaviour of the hobbits, both in The Hobbit and in The Lord of the Rings.

Tolkien has often been supposed to have spoken of wishing to create "a mythology for England"; though it seems he never used the actual phrase, commentators have found it appropriate as a description of much of his approach in creating Middle-earth, and the legendarium that lies behind The Silmarillion.

England

An English Shire 

England and Englishness appear in Middle-earth, more or less thinly disguised, in the form of the Shire and the lands close to it, including Bree and Tom Bombadil's domain of the Old Forest and the Barrow-downs. In England, a shire is a rural administrative region, a county. Brian Rosebury likens the Shire to Tolkien's childhood home in Worcestershire in England's West Midlands in the 1890s:

The Shire is described by Tom Shippey as a calque upon England, a systematic construction mapping the origin of the people, its three original tribes, its two legendary founders, its organisation, its surnames, and its placenames. Others have noted easily perceived aspects such as the homely names of public houses like The Green Dragon. Tolkien stated that he grew up "in "the Shire" in a pre-mechanical age".

The vanishing "Little Kingdom" 

Bree and Bombadil are still, in Shippey's words, in "The Little Kingdom", if not quite in the Shire. Bree is similar to the Shire, with its hobbit residents and the welcoming Prancing Pony inn. Bombadil represents the spirit of place of the Oxfordshire and Berkshire countryside, which Tolkien felt was vanishing.

Shippey analyses how Tolkien's careful account in The Lord of the Rings of the land in the angle between two rivers, the Hoarwell and the Loudwater, matches the Angle between the Flensburg Fjord and the River Schlei, the legendary origin of the Angles, one of the three tribes who founded England. 

Lothlórien, too, carries overtones of a perfect, timeless England; Shippey notes how the hobbits feel they have stepped "over a bridge in time" as they cross yet another pair of rivers to enter Lothlórien.

Industrialised England 

England appears in its industrialised state as Isengard and Mordor.
In particular, it has been suggested that the industrialized area called "the Black Country" near J. R. R. Tolkien's childhood home inspired his vision of Mordor; the name "Mordor" meant "Black Land" in Tolkien's invented language of Sindarin, and "Land of Shadow" in Quenya.
Shippey further links the fallen wizard Saruman and his industrial Isengard to "Tolkien's own childhood image of industrial ugliness ... Sarehole Mill, with its literally bone-grinding owner".

Anglo-Saxon England 

Anglo-Saxon England appears, modified by the people's extensive use of horses in battle, in the land of Rohan. The names of the Rohirrim, the Riders of Rohan, are straightforwardly Old English, as are the terms they use and their placenames: Théoden means "king"; Éored means "troop of cavalry" and Éomer is "horse-famous", both related to Éoh, "horse"; Eorlingas means "sons of Eorl"; the name of his throne-hall is Meduseld, which means "mead-hall". The chapter "The King of the Golden Hall" is constructed to match the passage in the Old English poem Beowulf where the hero approaches the court of Heorot and is challenged by different guards along the way, and many of the names used come directly from there. The name of the Riders' land, the Mark, is a Latinised form of "Mercia", the central kingdom of Anglo-Saxon England and the region where Tolkien grew up.

Englishness

Hobbits 

Englishness appears in the words and behaviour of the hobbits, throughout both The Hobbit and The Lord of the Rings. Shippey writes that from the first page of The Hobbit, "the Bagginses at least were English by temperament and turn of phrase". Burns states that

Burns writes that Bilbo Baggins, the eponymous hero of The Hobbit, has acquired or rediscovered "an Englishman's northern roots. He has gained an Anglo-Saxon self-reliance and a Norseman's sense of will, and all of this is kept from excess by a Celtic sensitivity, by a love of earth, of poetry, and of simple song and cheer." She finds a similar balance in the hobbits of The Lord of the Rings, Pippin, Merry, and Sam. Frodo's balance, though, has been destroyed by a quest beyond his strength; he still embodies some of the elements of Englishness, but lacking the simple cheerfulness of the other hobbits because of his other character traits, his Celtic sorrow and Nordic doom.

'English' characters 

Kindly characters such as Treebeard, Faramir, and Théoden exemplify Englishness with their actions and mannerisms. Treebeard's distinctive booming bass voice with his "hrum, hroom" mannerism is indeed said by Tolkien's biographer, Humphrey Carpenter, to be based directly on that of Tolkien's close friend, fellow Oxford University professor and Inkling, C. S. Lewis. Marjorie Burns sees "a Robin Hood touch" in the green-clad Faramir and his men hunting the enemy in Ithilien, while in Fangorn forest, she feels that Treebeard's speech "has a comfortable English ring". Théoden's name is a direct transliteration of Old English þēoden, meaning "king, prince"; he welcomes Merry, a Hobbit from the Shire, with warmth and friendship. Garry O'Connor adds that there is a striking resemblance between the wizard Gandalf, the English actor Ian McKellen who plays Gandalf in Peter Jackson's Middle-earth films, and, based on Humphrey Carpenter's biographical account, of another Englishman, Tolkien himself:

Shakespearean plot elements 

Some of the plot elements in The Lord of the Rings resemble William Shakespeare's, notably in Macbeth. Tolkien's use of walking trees, the Huorns, to destroy the Orc-horde at the Battle of Helm's Deep carries a definite echo of the coming of Birnam Wood to Dunsinane Hill, though Tolkien admits the mythic nature of the event where Shakespeare denies it. Glorfindel's prophecy that the Lord of the Nazgûl would not die at the hand of any man directly reflects the Macbeth prophecy; commentators have found Tolkien's solution – he is killed by a woman and a hobbit in the Battle of the Pelennor Fields – more satisfying than Shakespeare's (a man brought into the world by Caesarean section, so not exactly "born").

A mythology for England

Dedicated "to my country" 

Jane Chance's 1979 book Tolkien's Art: 'A Mythology for England' introduced the idea that Tolkien's Middle-earth writings were intended to form "a mythology for England". The concept was reinforced in Tolkien scholarship by Shippey's The Road to Middle-earth: How J.R.R. Tolkien Created a New Mythology (1982, revised 2005). In his 2004 chapter "A Mythology for Anglo-Saxon England", Michael Drout states that Tolkien never used the actual phrase, though commentators have found it appropriate as a description of much of his approach in creating Middle-earth. Tolkien wrote in a letter:

Drout comments that scholars broadly agree that Tolkien "succeeded in this project". Carl F. Hostetter and Arden R. Smith state that Tolkien created the mythology initially as a home for his invented languages, discovering as he did so that he wanted to make a properly English epic, spanning England's geography, language, and mythology.

A reconstructed prehistory 

Tolkien recognised that England's actual mythology, which he presumed by analogy with Norse mythology, and given the clues that remain, to have existed until Anglo-Saxon times, had been extinguished. Tolkien decided to reconstruct such a mythology, accompanied to some extent by an imagined prehistory or pseudohistory of the Angles, Saxons, and Jutes before they migrated to England. Drout analyses in detail and then summarises the imagined prehistory:

Old English heroes, races, and monsters 

Tolkien regretted that hardly anything was left of English mythology, so that he was forced to look at Norse and other mythologies for guidance. All the same, Tolkien did the best he could with the limited material available in Beowulf, which he much admired, and other Old English sources. Old English texts gave him his ettens (as in the Ettenmoors) and ents, his elves, and his orcs; his "warg" is a cross between Old Norse vargr and Old English wearh. He took his woses or wood-woses (the Drúedain) from the seeming plural wodwos in the Middle English Sir Gawain and the Green Knight, line 721; that comes in turn from Old English wudu-wasa, a singular noun. Shippey comments that

Carl Hostetter comments that all the same,

Hostetter notes that Eärendil, the mariner who ends up steering his ship across the heavens, shining as a star, was the first element of English mythology that Tolkien took into his own mythology. He was inspired by the Earendel passage in the Old English poem Crist I lines 104–108 which begins "Eala Earendel, engla beorhtast", "O rising light, brightest of angels". Tolkien expended considerable effort on his Old English character Ælfwine, whom he employed as a framing device in his The Book of Lost Tales; he used a character of the same name in his abandoned time travel novel The Lost Road.

A reflection of 20th century England 

Verlyn Flieger writes that "the Silmarillion legendarium" is both a monument to his imagination and as close as anyone has come "to a mythology that might be called English". She cites Tolkien's words in The Monsters and the Critics that it is "by a learned man writing of old times, who looking back on the heroism and sorrow feels in them something permanent and something symbolical". He was speaking about Beowulf; she applies his words to his own writings, that his mythology was meant to provide

Flieger comments that "Tolkien's great mythological song" was conceived as the First World War was changing England for ever; that it grew and took shape in a second era between the wars; and that in the form of The Lord of the Rings found an audience in yet a third era, the Cold War. She writes:

In her view, this is nearer to the vision of George Orwell's 1984 than to the "furry-footed escapist fantasy that detractors of The Lord of the Rings have characterized that work as being". She states that the main function of a mythology is "to mirror a culture to itself". She follows this up by asking what the worldview encapsulated in this mythology might be. She notes that Middle-earth is influenced by existing mythologies; and that Tolkien stated that The Lord of the Rings was fundamentally Catholic. All the same, she writes, his mythos is fundamentally unlike Christianity, being "far darker"; the world is saved not by a god's sacrifice but by Eärendil and by Frodo, in a world where "enterprise and creativity [have] gone disastrously wrong". If this is a mythology for England, she concludes, it is a caution not to try to hold on to anything, as it cannot offer salvation; Frodo was unable to let go of the One Ring, and Fëanor could not with the Silmarils. A shell-shocked England, like a battle-traumatised Frodo, did not know how to let go of empire in a changed world; the advice is, she writes, sound, but as hard for nations to take as for individuals.

Notes

References

Primary 
This list identifies each item's location in Tolkien's writings.

Secondary

Sources 

 
 
  
    
 
 
 
 
 
 
  
 
 
 
 
 
   
 
  Also published in A Tolkien Compass (1975) and The Lord of the Rings: A Reader's Companion (2005).
 
 

Middle-earth
Themes of The Lord of the Rings
England in fiction